The 1976 Champion Spark Plug 400 was a NASCAR Winston Cup Series race that took place on August 22, 1976, at Michigan International Speedway in Brooklyn, Michigan.

Background
Opened in 1968, the track's turns are banked at eighteen degrees, while the 3,600-foot-long front stretch, the location of the finish line, is banked at twelve degrees. The back stretch, has a five degree banking and is 2,242 feet long.

Race report
36 drivers took part in this race; David Hobbs was the only foreigner. The closing portion of the race would see Cale Yarborough, Richard Petty, Benny Parsons, Cale Yarborough and David Pearson vie for the win. The first 67 laps of the race would see fairly even competition. Tighe Scott's last-place finish was due to his vehicle overheating on lap 6 of 200. Fifty-five thousand people would witness David Pearson defeat Cale Yarborough by more than a second. The total time of the race was 171 minutes.

Cale Yarborough led more than 120 laps in both of the MIS races in 1976 but had to settle for second place both times. David Pearson bested him to win both races in the Wood Brothers Purolator #21 Mercury as he claimed the season sweep. This race was almost a case of deja vu for fans as weirdly the "top four" was the almost the same in this one as it had been for the earlier race in June with Richard Petty and Bobby Allison as the only other cars on the lead lap just as before; the only difference was that Allison was third in June while Petty flip-flopped their positions with his third-place run here.

NASCAR handed out a total of $120,025 to all drivers ($ when adjusted for inflation). The majority of the vehicles were Chevrolets.

While the winner took home $11,950 ($ when adjusted for inflation), the last-place finisher took home $1,250 ($ when adjusted for inflation).

Notable crew chiefs for this race included Billy Hagan, Junie Donlavey, Jake Elder, Harry Hyde, Dale Inman, Sterling Marlin and Tim Brewer.

John Haver would make his NASCAR Cup Series debut at this event while David Hobbs would wrap up his professional stock car career afterward.

Qualifying

Finishing order

Standings after the race

References

Champion Spark Plug 400
Champion Spark Plug 400
NASCAR races at Michigan International Speedway